Zanak is an Indian surname. Notable people with the surname include:

 Subhash Zanak (1955–2013), Indian politician
 Amit Subhashrao Zanak, Indian politician

Marathi-language surnames